The Supreme Soviet of the Tajik SSR was the supreme soviet (main legislative institution) of the Tajik SSR, one of the republics comprising the Soviet Union. The Supreme Soviet had very little  power and carried out orders given by the Communist Party of Tajikistan (CPT), until democratic elections held during glasnost and perestroika.

Chairman 
 Nigmat Ashurov (July 13, 1938 -?) 
 Tahir Pulatov (1945-1952) 
 Abduvahid Khasanov (? - August 17, 1961) 
 Mirsaid Mirshakar (August 17, 1961 - July 3, 1975) 
 Juraev Kandil  (July 3, 1975 - March 25, 1980) 
 Usman Hasanov (March 25, 1980 - March 29, 1985) 
 Talbak Nazarov (March 29, 1985 - November 18, 1988) 
 Muratali Tabarov (November 18, 1988 - April 12, 1990)

See also
List of Chairmen of the Supreme Soviet of the Tajik Soviet Socialist Republic

References 

Tajik Soviet Socialist Republic
1937 establishments in Tajikistan
1994 disestablishments in Tajikistan
Defunct unicameral legislatures
Tajik